Dąbrowa nad Czarną  is a village in the administrative district of Gmina Aleksandrów, within Piotrków County, Łódź Voivodeship, in central Poland.

The village has a population of 160.

Notable people
Aleksander Arkuszyński (1918–2016), Polish brigadier general

References

Villages in Piotrków County